The March is a 1990 British drama film directed by David Wheatley that was originally aired by BBC1 for "One World Week". The plot concerns a charismatic Muslim leader from the Sudan who leads 250,000 Africans on a 3,000-mile march towards Europe with the slogan "We are poor because you are rich."

Reception
The film's production resulted in complaints from French author Jean Raspail, alleging similarities to his 1973 novel, The Camp of the Saints. However, the film's producers said they had no knowledge of Raspail's novel when they began their project.

Notes

External links

1990 television films
BBC Film films
British television films
Films about illegal immigration to Europe
Films involved in plagiarism controversies
Films with screenplays by William Nicholson